Sarra Besbes (born 5 February 1989) is a Tunisian épée fencer, seven-time gold medallist at the African Fencing Championships. She represented Tunisia at the 2012 Summer Olympics in London, placing eighth, and at the 2016 Summer Olympics in Rio de Janeiro, placing fifth.

Personal life
Besbes was born into a sports family: her father, Ali is a former basketball player who became a physical education teacher; her mother, Hayet Ben Ghazi, is a former foil fencer who became an international referee. Her parents settled in Abu Dhabi before she was born. They had all their children–daughters Sarra, Azza, Héla and Rym, and son Ahmed Aziz–take up fencing. Azza and Héla are sabre fencers, while Ahmed Aziz is an epeeist. Sarra herself fenced foil until the 2006–07 season before switching to épée.

Career
At the 2011 World Championships in Catania, Besbes noticed she would fight an Israeli athlete during the qualifications phase. She asked the Tunisian Fencing Federation for instructions; the Ministry of Youth and Sports ordered her to drop the bout as part of the Boycott, Divestment and Sanctions campaign. Instead of refusing the fight, which would have resulted in sanctions, Besbes remained completely passive during her bout against Israeli Noam Mills, allowing the latter to strike without offering any resistance. This 5–0 defeat affected her seeding: in her first direct elimination bout, she met eventual gold medallist China's Li Na of China and was largely overcome. Besbes commented afterwards: “I did my duty.”

She qualified to the individual event of the 2012 Summer Olympics as the top-ranked female épée fencer for Africa. She defeated China's Xiaojuan Luo in the round of 32 and Korea's Choi In-jeong in the round of 16 but was defeated in the quarterfinals by eventual silver medallist Britta Heidemann of Germany.

During the 2014–15 season, Besbes was selected by the Tunisian Olympic Committee to be part of a special preparation programme for Rio 2016. She climbed her first World Cup podium with a gold medal in Buenos Aires; this made her the first Tunisian fencer of either gender to win a World Cup event.

She won a bronze medal at the 2015 World Championships.

Besbes again qualified to the individual event of the 2016 Summer Olympics, and reached the quarterfinal. She was ultimately ranked 5th. 

She competed at the 2020 Summer Olympics.

References

External links

1989 births
Living people
Tunisian female épée fencers
Olympic fencers of Tunisia
Fencers at the 2012 Summer Olympics
Fencers at the 2016 Summer Olympics
People from Abu Dhabi
Mediterranean Games silver medalists for Tunisia
Competitors at the 2009 Mediterranean Games
Competitors at the 2013 Mediterranean Games
African Games gold medalists for Tunisia
African Games medalists in fencing
Mediterranean Games medalists in fencing
Competitors at the 2015 African Games
Competitors at the 2019 African Games
Fencers at the 2020 Summer Olympics
21st-century Tunisian women